The inter-American convention on extraterritorial validity of foreign judgments and arbitral awards is a convention of the Organization of American States regulating the enforcement of judgements and arbitral awards in other member states.  The convention was concluded in 1979 at the Second Inter-American Specialized Conference on Private International Law and as of 2013 had 10 parties.

Parties

References

External links
Text of the convention
Parties

Treaties concluded in 1979
Treaties entered into force in 1980
Organization of American States treaties on Private International Law
Conflict of laws
Treaties of Argentina
Treaties of Bolivia
Treaties of Brazil
Treaties of Colombia
Treaties of Ecuador
Treaties of Mexico
Treaties of Paraguay
Treaties of Peru
Treaties of Uruguay
Treaties of Venezuela
1979 in Uruguay